Gollach is a river of Bavaria, Germany. It flows into the Tauber in Bieberehren.

See also
 List of rivers of Bavaria

References

Rivers of Bavaria
Rivers of Germany